Heather Holley is an American music producer, songwriter, vocalist, vocal producer, composer, pianist, and Pro Tools engineer, whose credits have yielded combined sales of over 29 million albums. She specializes in artist development and is known for her role in launching Christina Aguilera's career. She and Elicit Productions partner Rob Hoffman (Michael Jackson, Quincy Jones, Etta James), wrote and produced the recordings that led to Aguilera's signing to RCA Records.

Holley has also developed and/or worked with artists including Meredith O'Connor; Holly Brook aka Skylar Grey; Jackie Evancho; Nikki Williams; Katie Costello; Bebe Rexha; Martha Wash; Rebekah del Rio; Kat Perkins; Itaal Shur; and Dave Eggar. Her songs have been featured in prime time television series such as Grey's Anatomy, 90210, American Idol, The Office, Private Practice, So You Think You Can Dance, Ugly Betty, The Hills, Keeping Up With the Kardashians; feature films and trailers including Pursuit of Happyness, Kiss of the Dragon, and David LaChappelle's Rize; and runway shows for New York Fashion Week and ad campaigns for global brands such as Mercedes Benz, Pepsi, and Microsoft. Heather has been interviewed for VH1's Driven: Christina Aguilera and two E! Entertainment Christina Aguilera Specials. In their show at the 2017 Nobel Peace Prize Concert, Le Petit Cirque performed to Heather's song We All Need A Hero.

Christina Aguilera
In 1997, Heather Holley and Rob Hoffman were asked to write and produce a demo for a then unknown, former Mickey Mouse Club member named Christina Aguilera. Their work led to Aguilera's signing with RCA Records. Her self-titled debut album includes a song from Christina's demo called Obvious, which was written by Holley and produced by Hoffman. The album has sold over 17 million copies worldwide and garnered Aguilera a Grammy Award for Best New Artist in 2000.

In 2002, Holley and Hoffman contributed to Aguilera's second album Stripped, producing and co-writing the songs Soar, Stripped Intro, Stripped Interlude, and I Will Be, which was the B-side of the "Dirrty" single. Soar was featured in soundtracks and trailers for Rize, Honey, and The Pursuit of Happyness.

In 2004, Holley and Hoffman were commissioned by Mercedes to write and produce a new Christina Aguilera song Hello (Follow Your Own Star) for the international advertising campaign launching the Mercedes Benz A Class. The campaign included Mercedes Benz television spots with Aguilera, Giorgio Armani, and Boris Becker, and the end of the campaign featured a concert event in Milan where Aguilera performed Hello for the first time. The commercial featuring the song won a German advertising award and became a Radio hit in Europe, charting at #25 in Germany and at #6 in Italy.

In 2006, Heather's song "Here to Stay" was included on Christina's Back to Basics album and featured in a worldwide Pepsi commercial campaign.

In 2015, Soar was featured in Christina's World Hunger Relief PSA.

Charting

Christina Aguilera debut album #1 Us Billboard 200 Album chart 
Christina Aguilera "Stripped" #2 US Billboard 200 Album chart
12th Annual Unisong International Songwriting Contest Winners – Siren Song by Caitlin Lowery, Heather Holley
No Secrets (album) – Album charted #1 Billboard US Top Heatseekers.
First Ladies of Disco #6 Billboard Dance Club Chart

Appearances
VH1 Driven: Christina Aguilera
E! Entertainment Special: Christina Aguilera 2003
E! Entertainment Special: Christina Aguilera 2009

Published articles
"Soaring With Christina Aguilera" – published in the Wall Street Journal on January 11, 2011.

Discography

References

External links
 
 HeatherHolleyMusic.com
 Heather Holley at AllMusic.com
 Heather Holley Soundcloud

 http://girltalkhq.com/singer-meredith-oconnor-goes-from-being-bullied-to-anti-bullying-advocate/

21st-century American composers
American women composers
American women singers
Record producers from Texas
Living people
Musicians from Austin, Texas
Songwriters from Texas
Year of birth missing (living people)
21st-century American pianists
American women record producers
21st-century American women pianists
21st-century women composers